"Kein Plan" is a song recorded by Swiss rapper Loredana featuring German rapper Mero, released as the fourth single from her debut studio album King Lori (2019). The German-language rap song was written by the aforementioned rappers and produced by German producers Macloud and Miksu.

Background and music video 

"Kein Plan" runs for a duration time of two minutes and thirty five seconds. In terms of music notation, the song is performed in the key of C minor in common time with a vivace tempo of 102 beats per minute. It was written by the performing artists while being composed by German composer Chris Plowman and Loredana's frequent collaborators, German producers Macloud and Miksu. The latter producers alongside LEE were additionally responsible for the production whilst it was entirely mastered by Lex Barkey.

An accompanying music video was uploaded to the official YouTube channel of Loredana on 5 September 2019 around 23:59 (CET), where it has since amassed a total of 64 million views. It was directed by Matteo Attanasio of the Fati Media Group in Germany and produced by Flo Brunner. After its release, the music video was viewed 3.5 million times in its first 24 hours.

Charts

Certifications

See also 
 List of number-one hits of 2020 (Germany)

References 

2019 singles
2019 songs
Loredana Zefi songs
German-language songs
German-language Albanian songs
Song recordings produced by Macloud
Song recordings produced by Miksu
Number-one singles in Germany
Songs written by Loredana Zefi